Treze Tílias (German: Dreizehnlinden, literally "Thirteen Lindens") is a municipality located in the state of Santa Catarina, South Region, Brazil. It covers about 185.205 km² and sits about 470 km from the state capital, Florianópolis. The municipality population estimate for 2020 is 7,991. Treze Tílias was originally created on October 13, 1933.

Founded by Austrian immigrants, the large majority from Tyrol and Vorarlberg, Treze Tílias exhibits an Alpine-influenced timber framing style of architecture. Most residents speak Portuguese and the southern Austro-Bavarian dialect of Austrian German. The economy of Treze Tílias is based on agriculture, tourism, and woodworking.

References

Municipalities in Santa Catarina (state)
1963 establishments in Brazil